Norbergenin is a chemical compound. It is the O-demethylated derivative of bergenin. It can be isolated from rhizomes of Bergenia stracheyi.

References 

Pyrogallols
Lactones
Oxygen heterocycles
Heterocyclic compounds with 3 rings